Zapal may refer to:

Jaromír Zápal (1923–1984), Czechoslovak illustrator, painter and writer
Zapał., taxonomic author abbreviation of Hugo Zapałowicz (1852–1917), Slovenian botanist and natural scientist